The Selman Stërmasi Stadium is a multi-purpose stadium in Tirana, Albania.  It is currently used mostly for football matches and is the home ground of KF Tirana.  The stadium holds 9,500 people (all seated). It is named after Selman Stërmasi, one of KF Tirana's best players of all time. The stadium was also used by Dinamo and Partizani until 2010, however, due to failure to cooperate on the admittance fees, these teams were not allowed to use the stadium any further.

History
The stadium is located approximately 400 m from the west side of the Lana stream and of former exhibition site "Shqiperia Sot" (now Top-Channel Television headquarters). It was built in 1956 and named Dinamo Stadium until 1991 when it was given its new name. The Football Association of Albania and KF Tirana decided posthumously name the stadium after the eminent KF Tirana player, coach and president, Selman Stërmasi. The stadium has recently ended a long phase of construction, which involved development of the main pitch, central seated area, facilities around the ground and general lineaments. There are still improvements expected to be made, such as side seated areas, an electronic clock and a KF Tirana shopping centre just under the central seated stand. The internal facilities include a press conference room. The main parking area is located at the front of the stadium which leads to the entrance.

Renovation
In December 2014, work started yet again on Selman Stërmasi Stadium and the Skënder Halili Complex in order to fully renovate these grounds to be used by KF Tirana. The stadium's exterior, interior and playing surface was renovated and 8,150 seats were replaced as part of the renovations taking place.

Gallery

References

External links

 Worldstadiums.com

Football venues in Albania
Sport in Tirana
Multi-purpose stadiums in Albania
KF Tirana
Buildings and structures in Tirana